The 2022 Auckland local elections took place between September and October 2022 by postal vote as part of nation-wide local elections. The elections were the fifth since the merger of seven councils into the Auckland Council, which is composed of the mayor and 20 councillors, and 149 members of 21 local boards. Thirty-five members of 5 licensing trusts were also elected.

Mayoral election

The incumbent mayor, Phil Goff, did not stand for re-election. Wayne Brown was elected mayor.

Governing body elections
Twenty members were elected to the Auckland Council, across thirteen wards, using the first past the post vote system.

The final candidate list was released on 16 August. Provisional results were announced on 8 October. Preliminary results were released on 9 October. Official and final results were released on 15 October.

Rodney ward (1)
Incumbent Greg Sayers was re-elected.

Albany ward (2)

Incumbents Walker and Watson were re-elected.

North Shore ward (2)

Incumbents Darby and Hills were re-elected.

Waitākere ward (2)
Incumbents Linda Cooper and Shane Henderson sought re-eelction. Henderson was re-elected and Cooper lost her seat to Ken Turner.

Waitemata and Gulf ward (1)
Incumbent Pippa Coom sought re-election and was defeated by Mike Lee.

Whau ward (1)
Incumbent Tracy Mulholland sought re-election and was defeated by Kerrin Leoni.

Albert-Eden-Puketāpapa ward (2)
Incumbent Christine Fletcher sought re-election and Cathy Casey retired.

Maungakiekie-Tamaki ward (1)
Incumbent Josephine Bartley was re-elected.

Manukau ward (2)
Incumbents Alf Filipaina was re-elected and Efeso Collins retired to stand for Mayoralty. Lotu Fuli was elected in Collins' place.

Manurewa-Papakura ward (2)
Incumbents Daniel Newman and Angela Dalton were re-elected.

Franklin ward (1)
Incumbent Bill Cashmore did not stand for re-election. The contest was won by Andy Baker.

Ōrākei ward (1)
Incumbent Desley Simpson was re-elected.

Howick ward (2)
Incumbents Stewart and Young both sought re-election. Stewart was re-elected and Young lost his seat to former MP Maurice Williamson.

Local board elections

Licensing trustee elections
35 members were elected to 5 licensing trusts across Auckland.

Birkenhead Licensing Trust (6)

Mt Wellington Licensing Trust (6)

Portage Licensing Trust

Ward No. 1 – Auckland City (3)

Ward No. 2 – New Lynn (2)

Ward No. 3 – Glen Eden (2)

Ward No. 4 – Titirangi/Green Bay (2)

Ward No. 5 – Kelston West (1)

Waitākere Licensing Trust

Ward No. 1 – Te Atatū (2)

Ward No. 2 – Lincoln (3)

Ward No. 3 – Waitākere (1)

Ward No. 4 – Henderson (1)

Wiri Licensing Trust (6)

References

Politics of the Auckland Region
Mayoral elections in Auckland
Auckland